Muirpur Airport also spelled as Myorpur Airport is an upcoming airport, situated at Muirpur approx 12 km from the Renukut in the Sonbhadra district in the Indian state of Uttar Pradesh. Airport is developing by upgrading the existing government airstrip. It will serves nearby towns, Northern Coalfields Limited (NCL) (coal fields),NTPC projects Renukut and Robertsganj, the Other towns of Sonbhadra and Singrauli district. The airport will serve the region which has many electrical power stations, known as "Energy Capital of India".
It’s 26.5 km away from DUDHI TEHSIL.

Tourist Places Near By Myorpur , Sonbhadra 

Sarguja
Baikunthpur
Rohtasgarh Fort
Ambikapur
Betla National Park

DEMOGRAPHICS
“ The grampanchayat Myorpur falls in Sonbhadra district situated in Uttar Pradesh state, with a population 764. The male and female populations are 395 and 369 respectively.”
Area (2020)	1937.75 km²
Population (2020)	517679
Population Density	267 people per km²
Male Population	271980
Female Population	245699
Nearest airport & distance (Aerial)	Lal Bahadur Shastri Airport, 119.8 km
Myorpur is surrounded by Babhani Block towards South , Dudhi Block towards East , Wadrafnagar Block towards South , Singrauli Block towards west.

Politics in Myorpur 
BJP , SP , BSP are the major political parties in this area.

Polling Stations /Booths near Myorpur 
1)Primary School Devrihwa 

2)Primary School Jura 

3)Primary School Gulaljhariya 

4)Primary School Khamhariya 

5)Primary School Dewri (north Part)

Communities served
 OYNEERAJ OPC PVT LTD
 Rihandnagar NTPC
 Shaktinagar NTPC
 Vindhyanagar NTPC
 Anpara UPRVUNL
 Obra UPRVUNL
 Renusagar UPRVUNL
 Pipri UPRVUNL
 Singrauli
 Renusagar Hindalco
 Finiva Group Of Company
 Finiva Nidhi Limited
 Finiva Financial Limited
 Finiva Tech Limited
 Finiva Retail Limited 
 Dalla Dalla Cement Factory etc.

See also
 Lucknow International Airport
 Varanasi International Airport
 Bareilly Airport
 Kanpur Airport
 Faizabad Airport
 Gorakhpur Airport

References

Airports in Uttar Pradesh
Proposed airports in Uttar Pradesh
Buildings and structures in Sonbhadra district